Thomas Caspar Gilchrist (15 June 1862-14 November 1927), was professor of dermatology at the University of Maryland before taking up the same position at the Johns Hopkins Hospital, Baltimore. He wrote on acne, erysipelas, X-ray dermatitis, porokeratosis, sarcoma of skin, and fatty atrophy. The fungal infection Gilchrist's disease is named for him.

References

1862 births
1927 deaths
English dermatologists
English medical writers
University System of Maryland alumni